Qayamat is a 1983 Indian Hindi action crime film directed by Raj N. Sippy. It is an Indian version of the 1962 Hollywood film Cape Fear. The film stars Dharmendra as a man who goes to jail and holds his police officer friend (Shatrughan Sinha) responsible for the jailing. On his return after a long sentence he sets about taking revenge, targeting the officer and his family (Smita Patil and Poonam Dhillon). Jaya Prada appears in flashbacks as Dharmendra's wife. The film was remade in Telugu as Nippulanti Manishi with Nandamuri Balakrishna.
The famous song from the film Guide, Aaj Phir Jine ki Tamanna Hai was reused in this film.

Cast

 Dharmendra as Shyam / Rajeshwar 
 Shatrughan Sinha as S.P. Kamal 
 Smita Patil as Shashi 
 Poonam Dhillon as Sudha 
 Jaya Prada as Geeta 
 Shakti Kapoor as Kaalia 
 Bindu as Munnibai Heera Chand 
 Iftekhar as Retired Judge Sinha
 Sudhir Dalvi as Raghu
 Bharat Kapoor as Makhan
 Pinchoo Kapoor as Police Commissioner
 Satyendra Kapoor as Senior Police Inspector
 Arun Bakshi as Police Inspector
 Prema Narayan as Dancer / Singer
 Jayshree T. as Dancer / Singer
 Gurbachan Singh as Dayal
 Madhu Malhotra as Madhu
 Narendra Nath as Lobo
 Ram Mohan as Karim
 Tamanna as Shama
 Vikas Anand as Public Prosecutor

Crew
Director: Raj N. Sippy
Producer: Salim Akhtar, Salim Merchant
Story: Mohan Kaul, Ravi Kapoor, Satyanand
Dialogue: Kader Khan, N. S. Bedi
Cinematographer: Anwar Siraj, Mohan
Editor: Guru Dutt Shirali, Waman B. Bhosle
Art Director: Babu Rao Poddar
Costumes Designer: Anna Singh, Dave, Kachins, Shantaram Sawant
Choreographer: Kamal, Oscar, Suresh Bhatt, Vijay
Action Director: Veeru Devgan
Music Director: R. D. Burman
Lyrics: Majrooh Sultanpuri
Playback Singer: Asha Bhosle

Soundtrack

External links 
 

1983 films
1980s Hindi-language films
Films scored by R. D. Burman
Indian films about revenge
Indian remakes of American films
Hindi films remade in other languages
Films directed by Raj N. Sippy